California's 13th State Senate district is one of 40 California State Senate districts. It is currently represented by Democrat Josh Becker of Menlo Park.

District profile 
The district encompasses the San Francisco Peninsula and the northwestern reaches of Silicon Valley. It forms the main corridor between the state's third- and fourth-largest and the San Francisco Bay Area's two largest cities: San Jose in the south and San Francisco in the north.

San Mateo County – 82.5%
 Atherton
 Belmont
 Brisbane
 Burlingame
 East Palo Alto
 Foster City
 Half Moon Bay
 Hillsborough
 Menlo Park
 Millbrae
 Pacifica
 Portola Valley
 Redwood City
 San Bruno
 San Carlos
 San Mateo
 South San Francisco – 72.6%
 Woodside

Santa Clara County – 18.8%
 Los Altos
 Los Altos Hills
 Palo Alto
 Mountain View
 Sunnyvale

Election results from statewide races

List of senators 
Due to redistricting, the 13th district has been moved around different parts of the state. The current iteration resulted from the 2011 redistricting by the California Citizens Redistricting Commission.

Election results 1992 - present

2020

2016

2012

2008

2004

2000

1996

1992

See also 
 California State Senate
 California State Senate districts
 Districts in California

References

External links 
 District map from the California Citizens Redistricting Commission

13
Government of San Mateo County, California
Government of Santa Clara County, California
Brisbane, California
Burlingame, California
Foster City, California
Half Moon Bay, California
Los Altos, California
Menlo Park, California
Millbrae, California
Mountain View, California
Pacifica, California
Palo Alto, California
Portola Valley, California
Redwood City, California
San Bruno, California
San Carlos, California
San Mateo, California
South San Francisco, California
Sunnyvale, California
Woodside, California
Government in the San Francisco Bay Area